Hills of Oklahoma is a 1950 American Western film directed by R. G. Springsteen and written by Olive Cooper and Victor Arthur. The film stars Rex Allen, Elisabeth Fraser, Elisabeth Risdon, Robert Karnes, Fuzzy Knight and Roscoe Ates. The film was released on June 1, 1950, by Republic Pictures.

Plot

Cast
Rex Allen as Rex Allen
Koko as Rex Allen's Horse 
Elisabeth Fraser as Sharon Forbes
Elisabeth Risdon as Kate Carney
Robert Karnes as Brock Stevens
Fuzzy Knight as Jiggs Endicott
Roscoe Ates as Dismal
Robert Emmett Keane as Charles Stevens
Trevor Bardette as Hank Peters
Lee Phelps as Rancher Scotty Davis
Edmund Cobb as Rancher Johnson
Rex Lease as Joe Brant
Ted Adams as Henchman Sam
Lane Bradford as Henchman Webb
Michael Carr as Tommy
Johnny Downs as Square Dance Caller

References

External links 
 

1950 films
American Western (genre) films
1950 Western (genre) films
Republic Pictures films
Films directed by R. G. Springsteen
American black-and-white films
1950s English-language films
1950s American films